Maurice Archambault,  (5 April 1914 – 9 June 2002) was a Canadian lawyer and judge.

Born in Saint-Hyacinthe, Quebec, the son of Sylvani Archambault and Emma Beaudry, Maurice attended the Seminary of Saint-Hyacinthe from 1929 to 1935. Later, he graduated from the Faculty of Law at the Université de Montréal.

Career highlights
1938 - Admitted to the Bar of Quebec; held a legal practice in Farnham, Quebec until 1962
1950 - Named to the Queen's Counsel of Law; Served as Crown Attorney for the district of Bedford until 1960
1962 - Became a judge of the Superior Court of Montreal

Service and memberships
At the Bar of Bedford, Maurice served as secretary, syndic, and barrister's president. Memberships include General Council of the Bar of Québec and the committee of the Inspectors of the Bar. He also served as the chair of the Association of the Rural Bar.

External links

Information from 'Association des Anciens du Séminaire de Saint-Hyacinthe 

Université de Montréal alumni
Lawyers in Quebec
Judges in Quebec
People from Saint-Hyacinthe
1914 births
2002 deaths
Canadian King's Counsel